Glaister as a surname may refer to the following:

Andrew Glaister (born 1967), video game programmer
Gabrielle Glaister (born 1960), English actress
Geoffrey Glaister (1917 - 1985), English librarian
George Glaister (born 1918), English footballer 
Gerard Glaister (1915 – 2005), British television producer and director
Howard Glaister (born 1906), Mayor of Carlisle
John Glaister (1856 – 1932), Scottish forensic scientist
Lesley Glaister (born 1956), British novelist and playwright
Stephen Glaister (born 1946), Professor of Transport and Infrastructure, Imperial College London